Surendra Sirsat (1945/1946 – 29 March 2021) was an Indian politician and member of the Nationalist Congress Party. Sirsat was a member of the Goa Legislative Assembly in 1977, 1984, 1989 and 1994 from the Mapusa constituency in North Goa as Maharashtrawadi Gomantak Party candidate.

References 

1940s births
2021 deaths
People from North Goa district
Goa MLAs 1977–1980
Goa MLAs 1984–1989
Goa MLAs 1989–1994
Goa MLAs 1994–1999
Maharashtrawadi Gomantak Party politicians
Indian National Congress politicians from Goa
Nationalist Congress Party politicians from Goa